The name Marty has been used for eight tropical cyclones, seven in the Eastern Pacific Ocean and one in the Western Pacific Ocean.

In the Eastern Pacific:
 Hurricane Marty (1985) – no effect on land
 Hurricane Marty (1991) – briefly threatened the Mexican coastline 
 Tropical Storm Marty (1997) – not a threat to land
 Hurricane Marty (2003) – made two landfalls on the Baja California peninsula
 Tropical Storm Marty (2009) – never affected land
 Hurricane Marty (2015) – affected southwestern Mexico
 Tropical Storm Marty (2021) – had no effect on land; formed from the remnants of Atlantic basin Hurricane Grace

In the Western Pacific:
 Tropical Storm Marty (1996) – a minimal storm that killed 125 in Vietnam

See also 
 List of storms named Martin

Pacific hurricane set index articles
Pacific typhoon set index articles